The third cabinet of Ion Ghica was the government of Romania from 18 December 1867 to 11 March 1871.

Ministers
The ministers of the cabinet were as follows:

President of the Council of Ministers:
Ion Ghica (18 December 1870 - 11 March 1871)
Minister of the Interior: 
Ion Ghica (18 December 1870 - 11 March 1871)
Minister of Foreign Affairs: 
Nicolae Calimachi-Catargiu (18 December 1870 - 11 March 1871)
Minister of Finance:
Dimitrie A. Sturdza (18 December 1870 - 11 March 1871)
Minister of Justice:
Dimitrie Cariagdi (18 December 1870 - 11 March 1871)
Minister of War:
Col. Eustațiu Pencovici (18 December 1870 - 11 March 1871)
Minister of Religious Affairs and Public Instruction:
Nicolae Gr. Racoviță (18 December 1870 - 11 March 1871)
Minister of Public Works:
Dimitrie Berindei (18 December 1870 - 11 March 1871)

References

Cabinets of Romania
Cabinets established in 1870
Cabinets disestablished in 1871
1870 establishments in Romania
1871 disestablishments in Romania